Kazipur is an upazila or sub-district of Sirajganj District in the Rajshahi Division of Bangladesh.

Geography
The main river is the Jamuna, which branches and rejoins several times. The Ichamati crosses the western edge of the upazila. It is bounded by Dhunat, Sariakandi and Sarishabari upazilas on the north, Sirajganj sadar upazila on the south, Sarishabari upazila and the Jamuna river on the east, Dhunat upazila on the west.

Population
Par the 2001 Bangladesh census, Kazipur has a population of 2,66,950; male constituted 136056 ofbthe population, female 130894; Muslim 260646, Hindu 6286 and others 18.

As of the 1991 Bangladesh census, Kazipur had a population of 244,804. 50.39% male and 49.61% female. The adult population is 120,257. Kazipur had an average literacy rate of 30.5% (7+ years), against the national average of 42.4% literate.

Administration
Kazipur Thana, now an upazila, was formed in 1920.

Kazipur Upazila is divided into Kazipur Municipality and 12 union parishads: Chargirish, Chalitadanga, Gandail, Kazipur, Khasrajbari, Maijbari, Mansur Nagar, Natuarpara, Nishchintapur, Sonamukhi, Subhagacha, and Tekani. The union parishads are subdivided into 108 mauzas and 172 villages.

Kazipur Municipality is subdivided into 9 wards and 11 mahallas.

Education
Educational institutions: College: 1. Govt. Bangabandhu Degree College (1998), 2.Kazipur Government Mansur Ali College,R.I.M Degree College-Tenglahata(1969), Meghai UUI Multilateral High School (1919), Subgacha Tenglahata Rafatullah Multilateral High School (1944) Gandhail High School (1946), Rani Dinamoni High School (1957), Kazipur A.M.u Government Girls' High School, Tarakandi High School (1937). 
Shaheed M Monsur Ali Institute Of Health Technology-IHT, Kazipur, Sirajganj was founded in 2015. 
Begum Amina Mansur Textile Engineering Institute, Kazipur, Sirajganj project is ongoing and is expected to start enrolment anytime soon.

Notable residents
 Captain Muhammad Mansur Ali was the national leader of Bangladesh. 
 Mohammed Nasim MP (former Home Minister and Health Minister)

References

Upazilas of Sirajganj District